Home on the Range is a 1946 American Western film directed by R. G. Springsteen and written by Betty Burbridge. The film stars Monte Hale, Lorna Gray, Bob Nolan, Tom Chatterton, Robert Blake and LeRoy Mason. The film was released on April 18, 1946, by Republic Pictures.

Plot
When two brothers settle a wilderness, one builds the largest cattle ranch in the state while the other creates a game preserve to protect the wild life. When Grizzly's brother dies, Bonnie takes over and soon finds that the bears are killing her cattle. Bonnie starts hunting bears, but she does not know that Dan is behind the attacks on her cattle with a caged bear. Dan wants to take over Grizzly's land. Monte is working for Grizzly to protect the wild animals until Grizzly can donate the land to the government as a preserve.

Cast  
Monte Hale as Monte Hale
Lorna Gray as Bonnie Garth 
Bob Nolan as Bob
Sons of the Pioneers as Ranch Hands / Musicians
Tom Chatterton as Grizzly Garth
Robert Blake as Cub Garth 
LeRoy Mason as Dan
Roy Barcroft as Henchman
Kenne Duncan as Henchman
Budd Buster as Sheriff
Jack Kirk as Rancher Benson
John Hamilton as State Official

References

External links 
 

1946 films
American Western (genre) films
1946 Western (genre) films
Republic Pictures films
Films directed by R. G. Springsteen
1940s English-language films
1940s American films